Tom Werme is a television sports announcer who currently calls ACC College Basketball and Football for ACC on Regional Sports Networks broadcasts produced by Raycom Sports and Major League Lacrosse games for the Charlotte Hounds on ESPN3.

Biography
Werme calls football and basketball for the Big Ten Network and has done similar roles with the ESPN family, Fox Sports South, and Raycom Sports. He is also the sideline reporter and the pregame/halftime/postgame host for Oklahoma City Thunder telecasts and performed the same position with the Charlotte Bobcats. He has also done games for Fox College Sports. In 2009 in his NBA debut, Werme said, "I'm very excited to be back in the NBA, especially with an organization and  that is young and fresh with a bright future." He works with studio analyst Elissa Walker Campbell, play-by-play man Brian Davis, TV color analyst Grant Long, and radio broadcaster Matt Pinto as part of the crew of Oklahoma City Thunder broadcasts. He calls Charlotte Hounds games for ESPN3 along with college football, basketball, and NBA basketball and is employed by the PGA Tour Radio on PGA.com. Werme is a graduate of Syracuse University

References

Living people
National Basketball Association broadcasters
College basketball announcers in the United States
College football announcers
Women's college basketball announcers in the United States
American television sports announcers
Charlotte Bobcats announcers
College baseball announcers in the United States
Lacrosse announcers
Softball announcers
Syracuse University alumni
Major League Lacrosse announcers
Year of birth missing (living people)